Negro Swan is the fourth studio album by Blood Orange, an alias of British musician Dev Hynes. It was released on 24 August 2018 by Domino. The album was preceded by the singles "Charcoal Baby" and "Jewelry".

Release and promotion
On 19 July 2018, Hynes shared a teaser video of the album featuring a snippet of new music, before announcing the album and making it available for pre-order later the same day. The cover art features an image of Kai the Black Angel sitting on a car's front window with a white do-rag on his head and wings clipped to his back. The album was released on 24 August 2018 through Domino.

In a press release, Hynes described the album as "an exploration into my own and many types of black depression, an honest look at the corners of black existence, and the ongoing anxieties of queer/people of color. A reach back into childhood and modern traumas, and the things we do to get through it all. The underlying thread through each piece on the album is the idea of hope, and the lights we can try to turn on within ourselves with a hopefully positive outcome of helping others out of their darkness."  The album focuses on these themes heavily in today's current ideals of gender and sexuality. Honesty is a very powerful tool in the production of the album because it is what bridges the gap between understanding viewpoints of oppressed groups. With songs like "Hope" and "Runnin" masculine influences are brought into analysis in order to create an understanding of how societal forces impact the ideals of sexuality. Each song on the album presses this issue with a mix of soul, R&B, and other genre's styles in order to convey a story of facing depression.The press release also stated that the album was entirely written and produced by Hynes.

On 23 July, Hynes performed multiple tracks from the album at the Pitchfork Music Festival, including "Nappy Wonder" and "Charcoal Baby", the latter was released as the first single from the album on 26 July with a music video directed by Crack Stevens. Shortly afterwards, another single titled "Jewelry" was released, accompanied by a music video directed by Hynes, featuring an appearance from Janet Mock.

In promotion of the album, Hynes embarked on a North American and European tour which began on 5 August at the Osheaga Festival and ended on 8 November in Copenhagen.

Composition
Swan'''s 16 songs weave "impressionist" psychedelic pop and "interstellar" funk together, as well as working in "cosy" bedroom pop. Due to Blood Orange's eclectic musical sounds, Swan also digs into alternative pop, chillwave, dream pop, hip hop soul, post-punk, quiet storm, R&B, indie hip-hop, jazz, and more.

Critical reception

At Metacritic, which assigns a normalized rating out of 100 to reviews from mainstream publications, Negro Swan received an average score of 84, based on 26 reviews, indicating "universal acclaim". David Sackllah of Consequence of Sound stated that "Negro Swan is a grand work that gives credit to the pioneers of the culture while building a path forward within that framework, placing Hynes firmly in the canon as one of the most insightful musicians of his generation." Slant Magazines Zachary Hoskins wrote, "It's this ability to capture both sides with equal commitment—the struggle and the resistance through self-love—that makes Negro Swan Hynes's most assured, accomplished, and significant album to date." The Independent critic Jazz Monroe said "While Negro Swan elaborates on Hynes's best work, he remains grounded in cosy bedroom-pop by shambling drum machines, vocal compressors and gratuitous psych pedals."

In the review for AllMusic, writer Andy Kellman stated that the album, "qualifies as Hynes' most inward work, but it's a product of considerable interaction, whether the singer, songwriter, and multi-instrumentalist is handing off ideas to Diddy on the Connected-era Foreign Exchange-like "Hope", trading primary instruments with the Internet's Steve Lacy on the swirling "Out of Your League", or leaving enough room on each track for up to four additional voices, including Kelsey Lu, Amandla Stenberg, and Adam Bainbridge."

Accolades

Track listing
All tracks produced by Devonté Hynes.

Personnel
Credits adapted from Negro Swan'' album liner notes.

 Devonté Hynes – vocals, production, guitar, bass, keyboards, saxophone, drums, drum programming, electronic wind instrument, piano, sampling, mixing, art direction
 Janet Mock – narration 
 Ian Isiah – vocals 
 Amandla Stenberg – vocals 
 BEA1991 – vocals 
 Ava Raiin – vocals 
 Adam Bainbridge – vocals 
 Aaron Maine – vocals 
 Tei Shi – vocals 
 Puff Daddy – vocals 
 Eva Tolkin – vocals 
 Zuri Marley – vocals 
 Fai Khadra – vocals 
 ASAP Rocky – vocals 
 Project Pat – vocals 
 Diana Gordon – vocals 
 Caroline Polachek - vocals 
 Kelsey Lu – vocals 
 Georgia Anne Muldrow – vocals 
 Steve Lacy – vocals , keyboards , drums 
 Marti – vocals 
 Andrew Aged – vocals , guitar 
 Austin Williamson (of Onyx Collective) – drums 
 Jason Arce – flute , saxophone 
 Mikey Freedom Hart – piano , guitar , keyboards 
 Ben Marino – drums 
 Malcolm – synthesizer 
 Rob Ackwood – guitar 
 Matthew Testa – recording 
 Zach Brown – mix engineering assistance 
 Mikaelin Bluespruce – mixing 
 Joe Visciano – mixing , additional mixing 
 Ana Kras – cover art
 Matthew Cooper – design

Charts

Release history

References

2018 albums
Domino Recording Company albums
Dev Hynes albums